Gordeyevsky (masculine), Gordeyevskaya (feminine), or Gordeyevskoye (neuter) may refer to:

Gordeyevsky District, a district of Bryansk Oblast, Russia
Gordeyevsky (rural locality), name of several rural localities in Russia